European route E25 is a north–south European route from Hook of Holland in the Netherlands, to Palermo in Italy which includes ferry crossings from Genoa to Bastia (Corsica), from Bonifacio to Porto Torres (Sardinia) and from Cagliari to Palermo (Sicily).

It passes through the following cities:
Hook of Holland – Rotterdam – Utrecht - Eindhoven – Maastricht – Liège – Bastogne – Arlon – Luxembourg City – Metz – Saint-Avold – Strasbourg – Mulhouse – Basel – Olten – Bern – Lausanne – Geneva – Mont Blanc Tunnel – Aosta – Ivrea – Vercelli – Alessandria – Genoa ... Bastia – Porto-Vecchio – Bonifacio ... Porto Torres – Sassari – Cagliari ... Palermo.

Route description 
The Belgian part of the E25 is also denoted as 'Route du Soleil'. The title was rejected by France because there is already a 'Route du Soleil' connecting Paris and Marseille. The Belgian 'Route du Soleil' is a branch of the original route, connecting Amsterdam and Marseille and joining the E25 near Utrecht (NL) towards Metz (F).

The N205 carrying the E25 to the Mont Blanc Tunnel is named the "Route Blanche".

Morandi Bridge Collapse 
On 14 August 2018 a section of the A10 motorway called the Morandi Bridge collapsed in the city of Genoa, Italy, claiming the lives of 43 civilians. The reason for the collapse was a mix between what a witness reports as a lightning strike and poor design and questionable construction methods. This section of the route E25 reopened on 4 August 2020.

Route 

: Hook of Holland - Maasdijk
: Maasdijk - Rotterdam (Towards ) -  Gouda
: Gouda (Start of Concurrency with ) – Utrecht (End of Concurrency with )
: Utrecht - Vianen - Geldermalsen - 's-Hertogenbosch - Eindhoven - Geleen - Maastricht - Eijsden

: Visé - Liège
: Liège
: Liège
: Neufchâteau
: Neufchâteau - Arlon

: Kleinbettingen - Luxembourg
: Luxembourg - Dudelange

: Kanfen - Metz
: Metz - Freyming-Merlebach - Sarralbe - Strasbourg
: Strasbourg - Sélestat
: Sélestat - Colmar
: Colmar - Mulhouse (Start of Concurrency with ) - Saint-Louis

: Olten - Moosseedorf
: Moosseedorf - Bern
: Bern - Yverdon-les-Bains
: Yverdon-les-Bains - Lausanne
: Lausanne (Start of Concurrency with ) - Genève

: Saint-Julien-en-Genevois (End of Concurrency with )
: Saint-Julien-en-Genevois - Annemasse - Passy
: Passy - Chamonix-Mont-Blanc

: Courmayeur
: Courmayeur - Aosta - Ivrea
: Ivrea - Santhià
: Santhià - Vercelli
: Vercelli - Alessandria - Genoa
: Genoa
: Genoa
Gap (Ligurian Sea)
:  Genoa -  Bastia

: Bastia - Lucciana
: Lucciana - Porto-Vecchio - Bonifacio
: Bonifacio
Gap (Mediterranean Sea)
:  Bonifacio -  Porto Torres

: Porto Torres - Sassari - Codrongianos - Cagliari
: Cagliari
 Cagliari - Palermo

References

External links 
 UN Economic Commission for Europe: Overall Map of E-road Network (2007)
 The first section of the E25 in the Netherlands from Google maps
 Section of E25 in Sardinia from Google maps

 
25
E025
E025
E025
E025
E025
E025